Kap Shui Mun or Throat Gates (historically spelled Capsuimoon) is the channel between Lantau Island and Ma Wan in Hong Kong. It is part of major sea route along the coast of South China, from Victoria Harbour to the Pearl River. It joins north with Urmston Road. Kap Shui Mun Bridge, part of Route 8, spans the channel.

Name
The original Chinese name of Kap Shui Mun is kap shui mun, the gate of fast-moving water. This exactly describes the current of the channel. The name 'fast-moving water' was associated with accidents for ships and boats. To remove this malign influence, it was renamed to a title with similar sound, k'ap shui mun, meaning 'water-fetching gate'. For Chinese, water represents fortune and wealth.

See also

 Tang Lung Chau
 Tsing Chau Tsai Peninsula

References

New Territories
Channels of Hong Kong
Ma Wan
Lantau Island